Joel Oulette is a Canadian actor, most noted for his lead role as Jared in the television drama series Trickster. A member of the Cumberland House Cree and Red River Métis nations from Medicine Hat, Alberta, he was cast in the series as his first starring role after supporting performances in the television series Tribal and the films Parallel Minds and Monkey Beach. In February 2021, he starred in S2.E10 of the Netflix Series Two Sentence Horror Stories as an Indigenous man who faces a dark history when he and his girlfriend visit an old west reenactment for their podcast.

He is slated to star in Daniel Foreman's thriller film Abducted, currently slated for release in 2021.

At the 9th Canadian Screen Awards in 2021, he received a nomination for Best Actor in a Drama Series for Trickster.

Joel also played the main character Ben Taggart in the first season of the BYUtv and Family Channel series Ruby and the Well.

References

External links

21st-century Canadian male actors
Canadian male film actors
Canadian male television actors
First Nations male actors
Male actors from Alberta
People from Medicine Hat
Living people
Year of birth missing (living people)